Alişev Ğabdullacan Ğäbdelbari ulı (15 September 1908 – 25 August 1944), best known as Abdulla Aliş, was a Soviet Tatar poet, playwright, writer and resistance fighter. He wrote mostly novels for children, the most notable writings being: Dulqınnar (engl. The Waves, 1934), Ant (engl. The Oath, 1935), Minem abí (engl. My Brother, 1940), as well as fairy-tales, collected to Ana äkiätläre (engl. Mother’s Fairy-Tales, 1941). He also wrote several pieces for puppet-shows, the most notable Sertotmas ürdäk (engl. The Blabbing Duck).

In addition to his writing, Aliş spent his early years working towards the construction and improvement of an electric power station in the town of Menzelinsk, on the shores of the Qaban Lakes. From 1933 he worked as a professional journalist and executive secretary for the youth magazine Pioner kələme. In 1941, he was appointed Chief Editor of the Tatar Radio Committee.

In 1941, Aliş joined the Red Army and fought in World War II. That same year, he was taken prisoner by the Wehrmacht near the city of Bryansk. It was here that he met resistance fighter and poet Musa Cälil; both later gained entrance into the Idel-Ural Legion. While in prison, they formed an underground resistance group to oppose the Nazis. Their plans were later discovered, and as a result both men were guillotined in the prison of Plötzensee.

Notes

References

1908 births
1944 deaths
Soviet children's writers
Soviet male writers
People executed by guillotine at Plötzensee Prison
Resistance members killed by Nazi Germany
Soviet partisans
Tatar poets
Soviet people executed abroad
Tatar dramatists and playwrights
Tatar people of the Soviet Union
Soviet prisoners of war
Soviet military personnel killed in World War II
Writers from Kazan
Executed Russian people
People from Tatarstan